The Monastic Communities of Jerusalem were founded in 1975 by Brother Pierre-Marie Delfieux (died March 2013), until then prior general, with the aim of promoting the spirit of the monastic desert (cf. Charles de Foucauld) in the heart of cities.

In the communities' Rule of Life, Delfieux answers the question: why Jerusalem? "Because Jerusalem is the city given by God to men and built by men for God, thereby becoming the foremost of the cities of the world, and because your vocation is to be a city-dweller, you are a monk, a nun of Jerusalem. (§161) Be vigilant to keep in your heart a true concern for communion with all the sons of Abraham, Jews and Muslims, who are like you worshippers of the one God and for whom Jerusalem is equally a holy City." (§174)

These Catholic communities are present in

 Belgium : Saint-Gilles (2001- closed Juin 2017)
 Canada : Montréal (2004)
 France : Paris (1975), Vézelay (1993), Strasbourg (1995), Mont-Saint-Michel (2001), La Ferté-Imbault/Indre (département) (Magdala retreat house), Lourdes-Ossun
 Germany: Cologne, Groß St. Martin (2009)
 Italy : Florence, Pistoia, Gamogna (1998), Trinità dei Monti (2006) and then in San Sebastiano in Palatino (2016) in Rome
 Poland : Warsaw (2010)

See also

 Bose Monastic Community
 Catholic religious order
 New Monasticism related communities.
 Order of Watchers (Ordre des Veilleurs), a French Protestant fraternity of hermits.
Book of the First Monks
Desert Fathers
Hermit
Mary of Egypt
Poustinia

Sources
 The Jerusalem Community Rule of Life (foreword by Carlo Carretto). Paulist Press, 1985. .

External links

 Official website
 KTO, the French Catholic television service, presents video of daily services from the Jerusalem community in Paris (Monday to Friday, except in August).

Christian organizations established in 1975
Catholic religious orders established in the 20th century